The Budge Budge Institute of Technology or BBIT is a self-financing college in West Bengal, India offering diploma, undergraduate and postgraduate courses in Engineering and Technology and other allied fields. It was established by a trust named Jagannath Gupta Family Trust. The campus is located at Nischintapur, Budge Budge.

The college is affiliated to West Bengal State Council of Technical Education (diploma courses), Maulana Abul Kalam Azad University of Technology (undergraduate and postgraduate courses) and all the relevant programmes are approved by the All India Council for Technical Education. Techwala a digital marketing consultant in Kolkata, maintains BBIT's social media and other technical area related to website.

Academics 
The institute offers five diploma courses:
 DIPLOMA in Electronics and Tele Communication Engineering (ETCE)- 3 years
 DIPLOMA in Electrical Engineering (EE) – 3 years
 DIPLOMA in Mechanical Engineering (ME) – 3 years
 DIPLOMA in Computer Science and Technology (CST)- 3 years
 DIPLOMA in Civil Engineering (CE) – 3 years
It also offers six undergraduate courses:
 B.Tech. in Computer Science and Engineering (CSE)- 4 years [Approved intake – 180]
 B.Tech. in Information Technology (IT) – 4 years [Approved Intake – 60]
 B.Tech. in Electronics and Communication Engineering (ECE) - 4 years [Approved intake – 60]
 B.Tech. in Electrical Engineering (EE) - 4 years [Approved intake – 60]
 B.Tech. in Mechanical Engineering (ME) - 4 years [Approved intake – 60]
 
 B.Tech. in Civil Engineering (CE)- 4 years [Approved intake – 60]
Three post-graduate courses are offered:
 Master in Business Administration - 2 years [Approved intake – 60]
 M.Tech in Electrical Engineering(Power Systems) - 2 years
[Approved intake – 30]
 M.Tech in Computer Science and Engineering(General) - 2 years [Approved intake – 30]

See also
List of institutions of higher education in West Bengal
Education in India
Education in West Bengal

References

External links 
 

Universities and colleges in South 24 Parganas district
Colleges affiliated to West Bengal University of Technology
2009 establishments in West Bengal
Educational institutions established in 2009